The ETD Bridge over Green River is a steel girder bridge near Fontenelle, Wyoming, which carries Sweetwater County Road CN4-8SS (Fontenelle Townsite Road) over the Green River. The bridge is a replacement for a historic Pratt through truss bridge built in 1913 by the Colorado Bridge and Construction Company. The  bridge was one of the longest Pratt through truss bridges built in the early stages of Wyoming bridge construction.

The bridge was added to the National Register of Historic Places on February 22, 1985. It was one of several bridges added to the NRHP for their role in the history of Wyoming bridge construction.

See also
List of bridges documented by the Historic American Engineering Record in Wyoming

References

External links

Road bridges on the National Register of Historic Places in Wyoming
Bridges completed in 1913
Buildings and structures in Sweetwater County, Wyoming
Historic American Engineering Record in Wyoming
1913 establishments in Wyoming
National Register of Historic Places in Sweetwater County, Wyoming
Steel bridges in the United States
Girder bridges in the United States
Pratt truss bridges in the United States